Tijuana bibles (also known as eight-pagers, Tillie-and-Mac books, Jiggs-and-Maggie books, jo-jo books, bluesies, blue-bibles, gray-backs, and two-by-fours) were palm-sized pornographic comic books produced in the United States from the 1920s to the early 1960s. Their popularity peaked during the Great Depression era.

Most Tijuana bibles were obscene parodies of popular newspaper comic strips at the time, such as "Blondie", "Barney Google", "Moon Mullins", "Popeye", "Tillie the Toiler", "The Katzenjammer Kids", "Dick Tracy", "Little Orphan Annie", and "Bringing Up Father". Others made use of characters based on popular movie and sports stars of the day such as Mae West, W.C. Fields, Clark Gable, Joan Crawford, The Marx Brothers, Cary Grant, Jean Harlow, Babe Ruth, Lou Gehrig, and Joe Louis, sometimes with names only subtly changed. Before World War II, almost all the stories were humorous, cartoon versions of well-known dirty jokes that had been making the rounds for decades.

The artists, writers, and publishers of these booklets generally remained anonymous as their publication was illegal and clandestine. The quality of the artwork varied widely. The subjects consisted of explicit sexual escapades, usually featuring well-known newspaper comic strip characters, movie stars, and (rarely) political figures, invariably used without respect for either copyright or libel law and without permission. Tijuana bibles featured ethnic stereotypes found in popular culture at the time, although one Tijuana bible ("You Nazi Man") concluded on a serious note with a brief message from the publisher pleading for greater tolerance in Germany for the Jews.

The typical bible was an eight-panel comic strip in a wallet-sized  format with black print on cheap white paper and running eight pages in length.

Characters

Tillie and Mac are thought to have been the first Tijuana bible stars, along with Maggie and Jiggs from the popular newspaper strip Bringing Up Father. Tillie was soon followed by Winnie Winkle, Dumb Dora, Dixie Dugan, Fritzi Ritz, Ella Cinders, and other familiar comic strip characters stamped in the same mold. Making the most appearances in the bibles, Popeye and Blondie were the most popular characters in the 1930s. The first celebrity bibles were based on real-life newspaper tabloid sex scandals such as the Peaches and Daddy Browning case which made headlines in 1926. Ten years later, an entire series of bibles by one unknown artist obscenely lampooned Wallis Simpson and the King of England. By far the most popular celebrity character was Mae West, but virtually every major Hollywood star of the era was featured in the Tijuana bibles.

A popular comic strip character such as Tillie or Blondie might appear in as many as 40 eight-pagers drawn by ten artists. An entire series of ten bibles drawn by "Mr. Prolific" was based on famous gangsters; Legs Diamond, Al Capone, and Machine Gun Kelly were featured, while the artist working under the alias "Elmer Zilch" drew a set of eight comics about famous boxers such as Jack Dempsey. Another set of ten bibles drawn by Mr. Prolific featured radio stars, including Joe Penner and Kate Smith. Blackjack drew a set of ten comics using characters from Snow White, with each of the seven dwarfs starring in his own X-rated title.

The ten-book series format was dictated by the limitations of the printing equipment used to print the bibles, which made it convenient to print a set of ten titles at a time, side by side on a large sheet which was then cut into strips, collated, folded, and stapled. Typically, a new set of ten would be issued every couple of months, all drawn by the same artist, featuring ten cartoon characters or celebrities. For several months in 1935, Elmer Zilch and his publishers experimented with a ten-page format, issued with two-tone covers in four sets of eight, plus one set of ten (the "Salesmen" series) in the eight-page format. Each panel in this series was surrounded by an intricate engraved arabesque border, possibly intended as an anti-counterfeiting device as it was hard to reproduce, and the series became known to collectors as the "Ornate Borders" series. Only 42 bibles are known by collectors to have been issued in this style, and most of them were soon being reprinted in truncated eight-page versions. Often the added two pages were simply filler gag panels drawn by Zilch.

In addition to comic strip characters and celebrities, many bibles featured nameless stock characters like cab drivers, firemen, traveling salesmen (and farmer's daughters), icemen, maids, and the like. Very few original recurring characters were created expressly for the bibles; Mr. Prolific's "Fuller Brush Man" was one, in which a door-to-door salesman named Ted starred in a series of ten episodic eight-page adventures. To many collectors, this series was the epitome of the Tijuana bible genre.

During the Senate racket investigations of the 1950s, a New York businessman named Abe Rubin was asked if there was any truth to the rumor picked up by a Chicago police lieutenant that he had once been the original printer and distributor of "the Fuller Brush Man series of comics". The Fuller Brush man stories made a very weak stab at continuity (e.g., "The following week I was sent to Tallahassee" or some such words at the commencement of each installment), but each eight-panel story was self-contained. The only real serial stories told in the eight-pager format were three tales by Blackjack, featuring original characters named Fifi, Maizie, and Tessie, in "To be continued" narratives which stretched through three or four installments each before concluding.

History 

The term "Tijuana bibles" was first noted in Southern California in the late 1940s and refers to the incorrect belief that they were manufactured and smuggled across the border from Tijuana, Mexico. According to one possibly apocryphal tale, visitors spending the night at the cheapest hotels in Tijuana would find a Tijuana bible in the nightstand instead of a Gideons bible, hence the name.

In the 1930s, many early bibles bore phony imprints of non-existent companies such as "London Press", "La France Publishing," and "Tobasco Publishing Co." in London, Paris, and Havana. The popular line using the "Tobasco" imprint was around the underground market for a couple of years and also printed a number of pamphlet-sized erotic fiction readers, in addition to about 60 Tijuana bible titles, most of them original.

Tijuana bibles were sold under the counter for 25 cents in places where men congregated: barrooms, bowling alleys, garages, tobacco shops, barber shops, and burlesque houses. One commentator reminisces:

In some senses, Tijuana bibles were the first underground comix. They featured original material at a time when legitimate American comic books were still reprinting newspaper strips. After World War II, the quality and the popularity of the Tijuana bible declined.

Comics artist and historian Art Spiegelman notes that records do not seem to exist of prosecutions against publishers and artists for making Tijuana bibles; the cartoonist added, however, that authorities occasionally seized shipments and people selling Tijuana bibles. According to Spiegelman, it is not clear whether mom and pop outfits or organized crime created the small salacious booklets. Old newspaper crime stories seem to indicate that most bibles were the product of a fairly small group of independent small businessmen with their own printing presses, invariably springing up again in a new location after a police raid shut them down. These businessmen manufactured a variety of pornographic products, including pornographic playing cards, gag greeting cards, and film reels, and created their own underground distribution routes around the United States.

In the early days, Tijuana bibles could be shipped in bulk around the country through commercial express offices, usually the Railway Express Agency firm. It was a serious criminal offense to send them via the US mail, and one mail order dealer was sentenced to 5 years in Leavenworth in 1932 for simply soliciting orders from his customers through the US mail (at a dollar per bible: "These are not the cheap kind"), even though he guaranteed to ship them by commercial express. When the mails were used, complex schemes were used to foil postal inspectors, involving mail-forwarding, one-time use postal boxes, and non-existent addresses. The high success rate of the postal authorities in defeating these schemes is the main reason that bibles were generally sold locally rather than through the mails. When a seller was arrested and prosecuted for violating a local ordinance, the penalties were far lower than if a federal offense was committed; usually a seller got off with a 30-day sentence, a $100 fine, or probation after a local arrest, at least on a first offense.

Easy access to commercial shipping was suddenly cut off in the mid-1930s, so manufacturers began driving the products themselves to various underground depots around the country in cars and vans, taking advantage of a loophole making it not a federal crime (at that time) to take pornography across state lines in a private vehicle. The small size of the bibles made them easy to transport; 50,000 bibles could fit in the trunk of a car. Clandestine distribution centers were located in basements, lofts, and back alley garages in a chain of large cities on an east-west axis from New York City to Kansas City, loosely following the route of the old National Road and generally avoiding the South and New England which were regarded as dangerous places to be arrested for pornography. (Boston's Scollay Square, however, was a notorious place where Tijuana bibles could readily be purchased at seedy, hole-in-the-wall novelty shops patronized by sailors on leave.) Business was always done on a strictly cash basis, with generous discounts for bulk purchases to the local distributors who then resold them to retail vendors. The local distributors were not members of organized crime syndicates, but seedy small businessmen in an illegal black market business. The same vendors also handled cheap, off-brand black market condoms. A distributor's "territory" might be a large city, several counties, or an entire state, with the territorial boundaries being assigned by the national distributors, who regulated things by limiting the amount of goods delivered to each local distributor to the quantity that could readily be sold inside his (or in at least one instance, her) assigned territory.

Millions of Tijuana bibles were printed and sold in the 1930s, the heyday of the bibles. But the number of new Tijuana bible titles being produced took a nosedive at the beginning of World War II, and the industry never recovered. Factors in the decline of the Tijuana bibles at this time may have included police raids and the retirement of Doc Rankin, who was called up by the military at the beginning of the war, along with wartime shortages of paper and printing supplies. Printing plates of older bibles were worn down through continued reprintings until they were nearly blank, and original plates lost in police raids had to be replaced with new plates crudely recut by hamfisted, untrained amateur engravers. The quality of Tijuana bibles available on the market suffered, and prices dropped as sales plummeted.

When the business was revived after the war, the quality of new bibles was dismal: they were poorly drawn, badly printed, and the stories were amateurish and puerile compared to the work of a decade before. Mr. Dyslexic, the leading artist of the postwar era, was possessed of an almost staggering lack of drawing talent matched only by his bad taste and ignorance of the English language.
His best-known work "Traveling Preacher" is a lengthy, labored-over retelling of a novel by Erskine Caldwell (Journeyman), whom Mr. Dyslexic then proceeded to acknowledge by making Caldwell himself the star of another scabrous Tijuana bible ("Erskine Caldwell in Grandpa's Revenge").

Artists

Little is known about the anonymous artists who produced the Tijuana bibles. Wesley Morse (who later went on to draw Bazooka Joe) drew many of those appearing shortly before WWII, most notably about a dozen titles inspired by the 1939 World's Fair. Morse was the only major Tijuana bible artist who did not parody the newspaper comic strips, preferring to create his own characters. A number of books have alleged that freelance cartoonist Doc Rankin was the creator of hundreds of Tijuana bibles in the 1930s, although this remains unproven. Gershon Legman was around the New York City erotic book trade in the 1930s, and he claimed that Rankin was paid $35 weekly to produce two eight pagers, delivering the work to Louis Shomer, a gadfly book trade personality and publisher of a line of cheap pamphlet-sized jokebooks, chiefly remembered today for testifying against Ben Rebhuhn at the Falstaff Press pornography trial and as the author of a manual of tap-dancing. During World War II, with the production of new Tijuana bible titles shut down, Shomer employed Wesley Morse to produce hundreds of unsigned and uncredited cartoons, illustrations, cover art and advertisements for his line of digest-sized newsstand joke books, Larch Publications.

In addition to his identification of Rankin, Legman also claimed to know that one of the major Tijuana bible artists was a woman. A declassified FBI memorandum from the early 1940s confirms that they knew one of the main artists to be a woman, but the artist's name has been redacted from the document. It is likely that the artist referred to was Blackjack, who has never been positively identified but may possibly have been Legman's acquaintance, the erotic illustrator Clara Tice. Blackjack drew upon movie star fan magazines, both for story ideas and for visual reference, for titles like William Powell and Myrna Loy in "Nuts to Will Hays!", and followed the storylines of the daily newspaper comics closely and satirized them: the plot and characters of Annie and Rose in "Doughnut Girls Fill Up the Holes!" fits right in to the 1938 story arc in which Little Orphan Annie and her grownup friend Rose Chance tried to beat the Depression by starting a doughnut-making business. Blackjack's two baseball-themed bibles, featuring New York Yankees Joe Dimaggio, Lou Gehrig and Lefty Gomez, show a good awareness of the latest tabloid gossip about the Yankees' love lives as of spring training 1937, although the pairing of Lou Gehrig with Mae West seems to be purely a figment of Blackjack's imagination.

Collectors have assigned names to several anonymous artists with recognizable styles: "Mr. Prolific" was the creator of the "Adventures of a Fuller Brush Man" series, and the master of a sure-handed, elegant steel-pen inking style. "Mr. Dyslexic" was a seemingly clumsy, semi-literate artist who produced numerous titles in the postwar period, some with political content (e.g., Senator Robert A. Taft breaking a strike by sleeping with union members' wives). "Blackjack" was an artist active around 1938 whose work frequently depicted imaginary pairings of famous Hollywood movie stars, the artwork featuring large solid black areas and sometimes resembling linoleum block prints. The name "Elmer Zilch" appears on a number of bibles that appeared circa 1934. Zilch was an early and witty creator of the mid-1930s, rivaling Mr. Prolific in talent, popularity, and productivity, who may have been Doc Rankin. Rankin had a studio in midtown Manhattan, directly across the street from Macy's department store, where he produced commercial artwork on commission, so there is the possibility that assistants were involved.

Commentators have claimed to discern the styles of from a dozen to twenty artists who produced 10 or more bibles during their heyday, with the most productive artists (Mr. Prolific and Elmer Zilch) each drawing from 150 to 200 titles; followed by the output of Wesley Morse, Blackjack, and Mr. Dyslexic, who each produced about half that many. These five artists may have drawn half of all the Tijuana bibles ever done. There were also two anonymous artists in the 1950s who each drew about 60 to 80 cheaply produced titles, sold for a dime each to a clientele which allegedly consisted largely of high school boys. These late-period bible series included such titles as "Bellhop Kicks Dog" and a number of "Archie"-themed comics.

A few observers believe that Mr. Prolific and Elmer Zilch may even have been the same artist working in two styles to vary his output and extend his shelf life. The byline "Elmer Zilch" appears on a number of Tijuana bibles which evidently came on the market in 1934 and 1935, and the same artist's unmistakable "big-foot" cartoony style can be seen in many more. The name "Elmer Zilch" referred to a fictional character who was the mascot of the humor magazine Ballyhoo.

The total number of distinct stories produced is unknown but has been estimated by Art Spiegelman to be between 700 and 1,000. These were endlessly reprinted, redrawn, retitled, and pirated, with nearly illegible "nth-generation" copies circulating decades after the originals were first issued. The majority of old Tijuana bibles seen today are reprints dating from the 1950s.

In addition to the eight-pagers, there were also the more expensive "16-pagers", printed in a larger page size with more pages, and usually more carefully drawn and better printed. These were high-priced and less common than the eight-pagers but showcased the artists' best work.

Police seizures 

In 1930 the sale of two Tijuana bibles for 25 cents each, at the barber shop in the sleepy mountain hamlet of Dover Plains, was front page news. The affair was uncovered when a maiden aunt, going through her 17-year-old nephew's clothes to prepare them for the wash, discovered the bibles in the back pocket of his jeans, and notified the police. The guilty barber blamed a mysterious stranger from Poughkeepsie who had supplied him with the merchandise (never identified, but possibly Abe Rubin, a pioneering Tijuana bible distributor, who was arrested in the nearby village of Wingdale in 1932). One of the two bibles sold in Dover Plains was identified as "The Old Man Steps Out", a Maggie and Jiggs title later reprinted by Tobasco.

The earliest known Tijuana bible arrest occurred in Terre Haute, Indiana, in 1926, when a cache of bibles was discovered in a student's school locker at Wiley High School. Police traced the source back to a highly respected local newspaper editor named Charles Jewett (managing editor of the Terre Haute Star) and his son, a job printer. A federal charge was also placed against them because some of the bibles had been shipped across state lines to Rochester, Minnesota, home of the Mayo Clinic, where Cap'n Billy's Whiz Bang, America's leading outlet for guardedly smutty humor, is said to have gotten its start a few years earlier as a risque joke sheet passed around among the convalescing soldiers.

"Jewett was arrested following an investigation by authorities of the origin of a book of indecent pictures in which popular comic strip characters figure," a local newspaper reported. "The arrests grew out of an investigation, which had been quietly going on for three or four weeks, following the finding that several Wiley high school boys were in possession of an obscene publication based on a current strip in the Sunday papers. Further inquiry led to a search of the printing offices conducted by Jackson Jewett, under the name of the Jewett Printing Company, where a number of zinc etchings, from which the strips were printed, together with a quantity of booklets, bound and ready for distribution, were seized. It was said at the time that the elder Jewett had taken the contract for printing the strips and had attended to their distribution." Charles Jewett was sentenced to six months in a state workhouse, and father and son left Terre Haute afterward. It is not known today which particular bibles were involved, but the earliest bibles are sometimes dated to 1925, particularly early "Tillie and Mac" and "Maggie and Jiggs" stories which were issued without covers or titles at the time, and were not always eight pages long. The Kinsey Institute has in its possession an early Tillie and Mac story involving Mac finding a used condom in Tillie's wastebasket ("I wondered where that had gone", she says brightly), which has an archivist's notation "First seen Oklahoma 1926".

On the rare occasions that the Tijuana bibles were mentioned in the press, they were usually described vaguely and without identifying detail as "cartoon books", an ambiguous term that could just as easily refer to licensed collections of newspaper strips such as the Cupples & Leon reprint books. People would order "cartoon books" from the mysterious and ambiguously worded advertisements that appeared in the back pages of the Police Gazette starting in the late 1920s, but they had no way of knowing which they would receive. Buyers were sometimes advised to "state explicitly what you want". If a news story concerned a police raid, a clarifying adjective might be employed, such as "indecent", "lewd", or "obscene", as in the following 1930 news item about an arrest in midtown Manhattan:

The scale on which Tijuana bibles were produced can be gauged from the large hauls announced in police seizures. Eight million bibles were reported seized in one November 1942 raid by FBI agent P.E. Foxworth and his men on a Manhattan warehouse and a printing plant in the loft over a garage in the South Bronx. Small-time businessmen Jacob and David Brotman were arrested in that raid, along with several associates. The majority of the Tijuana bibles circulating in the country were being printed in this loft on a Babcock press. The lease on the 2250 square foot loft had been taken out a year earlier by the Brotmans' brother-in-law, who was their partner in a bowling alley located in Manhattan under the George Washington Bridge.

According to the FBI, four tons of material were ready to ship across the country, and seven tons had already gone out and were being rounded up at regional distribution centers in Baltimore, Pittsburgh, Cleveland/Akron, Indianapolis, and Kansas City. Jacob Brotman was identified as one of the main players in the Tijuana bible trade in Jay Gertzman's Bookleggers and Smuthounds, and he had previously been arrested in a similar raid on a Lower East Side loft reported in the New York City papers in 1936 which produced a large haul of bibles, erotic fiction "readers", pornographic playing cards, and nude photos, along with cutting and binding equipment and an expensive modern printing press which police could not confiscate because it turned out to be leased. The firm had been operating under the guise of a playing card manufacturer.

During the 1939 World's Fair, men selling pornographic booklets on the midway at the fair were trailed to a warehouse near the Brooklyn Navy Yard where David Brotman and Ben Reisberg (who was later arrested again with Louis Shomer in Virginia) were arrested and a cache was seized of 350,000 printed items and photos and 50,000 condoms, along with printing plates. 

Collectors have estimated that as many as 50,000 copies would be produced of a single title in this period, and distributed around the country through an underground network of independent local and regional distributors, many of them former bootleggers. A local distributor such as Andrew Hepler in northern Virginia or Frank Lang in Pittsburgh would typically buy them in bulk batches of 20,000 or more as new product became available (typically 10 or 20 new titles), break the shipment into packets of 100 or so bibles, and drive around the distribution territory dropping them off at pool halls, gas stations, barber shops, and taverns. If the distributor did not cross a state line while making his rounds, it was very difficult to charge him (or her, in a few cases) with a federal offense, although in the Hepler case authorities were able to sentence him to five years in the Atlanta Penitentiary—not for distributing pornography, but on the charge that he had cheated his business partner on the proceeds.

In New York City, police raids on the business were carried out at intervals for decades, usually at the instigation of John S. Sumner and the New York Society for the Suppression of Vice, which closely watched the trade in pornography in the city during the years of its existence. In Boston, this function was carried out by the Watch and Ward Society, which exchanged information with Sumner's organization in New York to coordinate their efforts. There was a similar group in Chicago, the Illinois Vigilance Association led by Rev. Philip Yarrow; while in Philadelphia the energetic Rev. Mary Hubbert Ellis, a Primitive Methodist minister, assembled an ad hoc coalition and terrorized the local smut industry with a series of raids for two years until her enemies and their lawyers were finally able to turn the tables and force her to leave town after she accepted a $100 donation from one of the dealers in exchange for not raiding his premises. Mr. Prolific mocks these foes in one of his bibles, in the form of a guardian of public morals named "Smuthound" who apprehends Betty Boop while she is engaged in having sex with a lifeguard on the beach (Betty Boop in "Improvising").

The FBI monitored the Tijuana bible trade but rarely made arrests. A large file of specimen bibles was maintained at FBI headquarters, eventually comprising over 5,000 items, for the purpose of tracing printers and distributors. As a result of the 1942 raids the FBI came into possession of thousands of engraved printing plates used to print the original bibles; these gathered dust in a storage cabinet at FBI headquarters for years awaiting a final decision on their destruction.

Cultural references

Early in the graphic novel Watchmen, the current Silk Spectre (Laurie Juspeczyk) visits her mother (past Silk Spectre Sally Jupiter) and briefly reads a Tijuana bible featuring her. Sally finds it flattering and keeps it as a reminder of her past sex appeal, but Laurie finds the comic obscene. The same Tijuana bible is later given away as a gift, owing to its present nature as a collector's novelty item.

Will Eisner features Tijuana bibles in the first pages of his book The Dreamer, though nothing explicit is shown. His protagonist Billy is a young artist out looking for work who is offered a job illustrating them by a printer and a mobster. He is shocked and incensed and asks if they are legal. The vignette serves to focus conflict between the character's dream and reality, but also between legitimate and illicit comic production. Dejected, Billy says that he will think it over. The theme is reminiscent of a real-life episode described by Eisner about being asked by a shady Brooklyn businessman to draw for the publications at a rate of $3 a page, which was good money at the time.

Joe Shuster drew Tijuana bible-like illustrations for an underground bondage-themed erotic series called Nights of Horror in the early 1950s. His male characters are strongly reminiscent of Superman, and some of his female characters resemble Lois Lane. Thousands of copies of Nights of Horror were seized in a police raid on a Times Square book store, but Shuster's name did not come to light in the ensuing prosecution.

The young Hugh Hefner experimentally drew several Tijuana bibles as samples for a projected series which was never published, when he was a struggling cartoonist in Chicago in the early 1950s, around the same time that he issued his self-published cartoon book That Toddlin' Town.

The title character in the 1959 semi-autobiographical Canadian novel The Apprenticeship of Duddy Kravitz by Mordecai Richler sells Tijuana bibles to his high school classmates, some featuring Dick Tracy, after buying them in bulk from a newsstand vendor who assigns him a small part of the city as his sales territory. He hears that the news vendor has been arrested, then panics and destroys all the bibles.

The English garage punk band The Flaming Stars released the album Tijuana Bible 
in 2000.

In the 2006 novel Water for Elephants, the term "eight-pager" is mentioned in several locations, one of these when Kinko the dwarf is caught masturbating by Jacob Jankowski while reading a Popeye the Sailor Tijuana bible.

The 1996 novel The Green Mile by Stephen King, features a scene in which guard Percy Wetmore is caught reading a Tijuana bible with fictional character "Lotta Leadpipe", and is asked what his mother would think of such material; this is included in the film version.

A 1954 episode of Dragnet ("The Big Producer") had Sgt. Joe Friday breaking up a high school smut ring which includes a teenage boy (played by Martin Milner) selling eight-pagers out of his school locker. They are called "joke books" by the seller. The term "Tijuana Bible" was used in the 1968 Dragnet episode "The Starlet".

During Year Six (2007) of the webcomic Something Positive, lead character Davan MacIntire discovers that the man whom he is named after, a cousin of his grandfather, had worked as a writer/artist of Tijuana bibles in the late 1930s. Randy Milholland, the creator of Something Positive, then created a spin-off series called Something Positive 1937 to tell the story of the first Davan.

In the graphic 2007 novel The League of Extraordinary Gentlemen: Black Dossier by Alan Moore and Kevin O'Neill, the titular Dossier contains a mock Tijuana bible (actually printed in cheap newsprint and included with the book) which, in the context of the story, was published by Pornsec, a department of the government of Big Brother (from George Orwell's novel Nineteen Eighty-Four).

In 2008, comic artists Ethan Persoff and Scott Marshall created an eight-page mock Tijuana bible lampooning President George W. Bush and Presidential hopeful John McCain entitled Obliging Lady. The comic was distributed at the 2008 Democratic National Convention.

In a 2018 issue of Howard Chaykin's scathing satire of the comics industry, Hey Kids! Comics!, two freelance comic book artists are shown furtively delivering artwork for upcoming Tijuana bibles to the (fictional) offices of the Tobasco Publishing Co.

See also

 Chick tract
 Elsagate, a phenomenon involving unauthorised depictions of popular children's characters in inappropriate situations
 Fan fiction
 Dōjinshi
 Hentai
 Rule 34 (Internet meme)

References

Further reading

External links

 Tijuanabible.org
 Tijuanabibles.org
 Cover gallery
 Mcgrath, George. "How Movie Stars Are Used in Obscene Booklet Racket" Police Gazette, October 1955.
 

American culture
Erotic comics
Pornographic magazines published in the United States
Underground comix
History of comics
Unofficial adaptations
Parody comics
Parodies of comics
Satirical comics
Comics based on real people
Obscenity controversies in comics